6395 Hilliard, provisional designation , is a stony Nysian asteroid from the inner regions of the asteroid belt, approximately 4.5 kilometers in diameter.

It was discovered on 21 October 1990, by Japanese astronomers Yoshio Kushida and Osamu Muramatsu at Yatsugatake South Base Observatory, Japan. The asteroid was later named after the British philanthropic couple Elizabeth and Leslie Hilliard, donors of the Herschel Museum of Astronomy.

Orbit and classification 

Hilliard is a stony member of the Nysa family, a relatively small family named after its namesake 44 Nysa. It orbits the Sun in the inner main-belt at a distance of 1.9–2.9 AU once every 3 years and 9 months (1,369 days). Its orbit has an eccentricity of 0.20 and an inclination of 1° with respect to the ecliptic.

The asteroid was first found on a precovery image taken at Palomar Observatory in 1949.

Physical characteristics 

Pan-STARRS photometric survey has characterized Hilliard as a common stony S-type asteroid.

According to the survey carried out by NASA's Wide-field Infrared Survey Explorer with its subsequent NEOWISE mission, Hilliard measures 4.082 kilometers in diameter and its surface has a high albedo of 0.351, while the Collaborative Asteroid Lightcurve Link assumes a standard albedo for stony asteroids of 0.20 and calculates a large diameter of 4.71 kilometers with on an absolute magnitude of 14.0, as diameter and albedo (reflectivity) are inversely related to each other.

Lightcurve 

No rotational lightcurve of Hilliard has been obtained from photometric observations. In 2006, observations at the RHIT in Terre Haute, Indiana, United States, rendered no observable brightness variation. As of 2017, the body's rotation period and shape remain unknown.

Naming 

This minor planet was named in honor of Elizabeth (1903–2001) and Leslie Hilliard (1905–1997), donors of the Herschel Museum of Astronomy in Bath, England. The museum was formerly the home of astronomer William Herschel, from the garden of which he discovered the planet Uranus in 1781. The official naming citation was published on 9 September 1995.

References

External links 
 Asteroid Lightcurve Database (LCDB), query form (info )
 Dictionary of Minor Planet Names, Google books
 Asteroids and comets rotation curves, CdR – Observatoire de Genève, Raoul Behrend
 Discovery Circumstances: Numbered Minor Planets (5001)-(10000) – Minor Planet Center
 
 

006395
Discoveries by Yoshio Kushida
Discoveries by Osamu Muramatsu
Named minor planets
19901021